The year 576 BC was a year of the pre-Julian Roman calendar. In the Roman Empire, it was known as year 178 Ab urbe condita . The denomination 576 BC for this year has been used since the early medieval period, when the Anno Domini calendar era became the prevalent method in Europe for naming years.

Events

Births
 Cyrus the Great, founder of the Persian Empire (or 600 BC)

Deaths
 Aeropus I, king of Macedon

References